Bogdan Mada (born 14 February 1989 in Timișoara) is a Romanian sprint canoeist. Mada is a member of the canoe and kayak team for Steaua Army Sports Club in Bucharest, and is coached and trained by Florin Scoica.

Mada qualified for the men's K-2 200 metres at the 2012 Summer Olympics in London, by finishing fourth from the 2011 ICF Canoe Sprint World Championships in Szeged, Hungary. Mada and his partner Ionuț Mitrea paddled to a fifth-place finish and thirteenth overall in the B-final by approximately ten seconds behind the Belgian pair Olivier Cauwenbergh and Laurens Pannecoucke, recording their slowest time of 46.495 seconds.

References

External links
NBC Olympics Profile

1989 births
Romanian male canoeists
Living people
Olympic canoeists of Romania
Canoeists at the 2012 Summer Olympics
Sportspeople from Timișoara